The  Durrës–Tiranë railway was a railway line which initially joined the two biggest cities in Albania: Durrës and Tirana. The line connected to the Shkodër–Vorë railway halfway in Vorë, and to the Durrës-Vlorë railway in Durrës. In September 2013, the Tirana end of the line was dismantled as the Tirana station was torn down to make way for the lengthening of the Tirana main boulevard. As a result, passengers to and from Tirana had to initially use the Vore station in 2013, and later the renovated Kashar station in May 2015. This was closed in 2018 and the tracks lifted. There is now no rail connection between Tirana and Durrës. The Durrës–Tiranë line was built during 1948-1949 based exclusively on work of volunteers and was the second passenger railway in Albania after the Durrës-Peqin railway which had been completed a year earlier. It was operated by Hekurudha Shqiptare. In 2021 Albanian State Railways signed a contract with Italian company INC for the rehabilitation of the Durrës-Tirana railway line and the construction of a new line out to Mother Teresa Airport. Work appears to have started with the construction of several new culverts.

History 
The railway was 38 km long connecting the two most important cities of Albania, Durrës and Tirana. It was built during 1948-1949 and was the second standard gauge passenger railway in Albania after that of Durrës-Peqin, which had started in 1940, and was completed in 1948.

The works started from the Shkozet station (near Durrës) on April 11, 1948. Overall 29,000 young people of the Labour Youth Union of Albania and 1400 qualified technicians from all Albania participated to the building of the railway. In addition, young volunteers sent from the Youth sections of the Communist parties of Bulgaria and Yugoslavia participated in the construction. During the Albanian-Yugoslavian split in 1948 the Yugoslavian volunteers were accused of sabotage, especially the engineers. The works continued under the supervision of Soviet engineer Valeri Gaydarov. Rails were imported from the Soviet Union through the port of Durrës. The volunteering brigades had as a goal to finish the railway by the 31st anniversary of the Red Army, on 23 February 1949, and the goal was successfully achieved.

Two of the most important works during construction were the Rrashbull Tunnel (212 m) and the Erzen Bridge (91 m long). The bridge was finished on October 16, 1948, the 40th birthday of then Prime Minister, Enver Hoxha. The tunnel was dug by the Bulgarian youth group Georgi Dimitrov, which was eventually given the Flag of the Brigades award. The brigade of the Albanian Police was instead awarded five times the Attacking Award. The inauguration was made by future would be Politburo member Spiro Koleka.

2010 accident 
An accident occurred on the railway on July 25, 2010. A police SUV was on the rail and the train could not avoid the collision with it. As a result, the police car was pushed for a certain distance until the train went to a complete stop. Not only were the three Albanian policemen not injured, but they also went to argue with the machinist to accuse him that he had to stop earlier and pay more attention.

Future

New Tirana station upgrade
Tirana rail station is being upgraded and moved from its original position. It is believed that the planned multi-modal station at Kamez Overpass will accommodate the defunct station, enabling additional trains to terminate there instead of its current position. The new station will also improve the terminating capacity of passengers. In 2015, some rail stations including Kashar, and rolling stock along the Durrës-Tirane line are being upgraded and the latter coloured red and white.

Renovation of the line 
In October 2016 the tender on the renovation on the entire line were about to start with the cost of 81,5 million Euros. It was estimated that it would cost around 1,4 million times a year.

In 2019 though, another tender was announced.

Stations

Timetable
During tourist season, an extra train engine was used to ensure a good connection between Tirana and Durrës.

See also
 Albanian Railways

References

Sources
Albanian railways in English
Article on the monthly passes

Further reading
A communist era program on the building of the railway

Railway lines in Albania
Railway lines opened in 1949